Rhonda Watkins (born 9 December 1987) is a Trinidad and Tobago long jumper.  She is the former national record holder in the event at 6.82m set in 2007 at the Prefontaine Classic.

Career

She won the gold medal at the 2006 World Junior Championships, and competed without reaching the final round at the 2008 Olympic Games. She also finished thirteenth in the high jump at the 2003 World Youth Championships.

She has 6.82 metres in the long jump, achieved in May 2007 in Eugene. In the high jump she has 1.84 metres, achieved in May 2007 in Palo Alto.

Achievements

External links
Picture of Rhonda Watkins

References

1987 births
Living people
Trinidad and Tobago long jumpers
Trinidad and Tobago female high jumpers
Athletes (track and field) at the 2008 Summer Olympics
Olympic athletes of Trinidad and Tobago
Athletes (track and field) at the 2010 Commonwealth Games
Female long jumpers
Central American and Caribbean Games gold medalists for Trinidad and Tobago
Competitors at the 2010 Central American and Caribbean Games
Central American and Caribbean Games medalists in athletics
Commonwealth Games competitors for Trinidad and Tobago